Emanuele Barbella (1718-1777) was a Neapolitan composer and violinist.

External links

References

1718 births
1777 deaths
Italian Classical-period composers
Italian male classical composers
18th-century Italian composers
18th-century Italian male musicians